Paul Gruchow (May 23, 1947 – February 22, 2004) was an American author, editor, and conservationist from Montevideo, Minnesota. A student of poet John Berryman, he is well known for his strong support of rural communities, as expressed in his first book, "Journal of a Prairie Year" published by University of Minnesota Press. His essays in Grass Roots: The Universe of Home, document his ideas with stories of growing up in rural Chippewa County Minnesota.

Career
Gruchow was editor and co-owner of the highly respected Worthington Daily Globe in Worthington during the late 1970s and 1980s.  When the newspaper was sold, he moved to Northfield, Minnesota, where he was an instructor at St. Olaf, Northfield, Minnesota and Concordia College, Moorhead, Minnesota.  His essays appeared in Minnesota Monthly Magazine (published by Minnesota Public Radio), the Utne Reader, and book reviews in the Hungry Mind Review.  In addition to Journal of a Prairie year, Gruchow's books include Discovering the Universe of Home and Boundary Waters: The Grace of the Wild; "the Necessity of Empty Places", St. Martin's Press, "Worlds Within Worlds", Minnesota Department of Natural Resources, and "Images of Home" with photographer Jim Brandenburg, by the Blandin Foundation of Grand Rapids, Minnesota.  A travel essay from "Empty Places" appeared in the Sunday NY Times. He wrote occasionally for The Utne Reader, and the Hungry Mind Review.

Death and legacy
Gruchow died by suicide on February 22, 2004, in Duluth, soon after completing the first draft of a book about depression. In memory of his literary contributions, an annual Paul Gruchow Essay Contest is conducted by Writers Rising Up to Defend Place, Natural Habitat and Wetlands through the Minnesota Landscape Arboretum.

In 2007 a collection entitled The Grace of Grass and Water: Writing in Honor of Paul Gruchow was published by the Ice Cube Press.

Letters to a Young Madman: A Memoir, Gruchow's seventh and final book was released in September 2012 by Levins Publishing in Minneapolis, Minnesota.

Books
 Boundary Waters: The Grace of the Wild
 Grass Roots: The Universe of Home
 Journal of a Prairie Year
 The Necessity of Empty Places
 Travels in Canoe Country
 Letters to a Young Madman: A Memoir

References

External links 
 Minnesota Authors Biography Project
 Paul Gruchow May 23, 1947 – February 22, 2004
 The Paul Gruchow Foundation
 Empty Places: Remembering Paul Gruchow, A chronicle of a death foretold Minnesota Monthly, November 1, 2004
 Paul Gruchow Essay Contest
 Minnesota Progressive Project: Remembering Paul Gruchow
 "Prairie tribute: Paul Gruchow's voice echoes in essays"

1947 births
2004 suicides
People from Montevideo, Minnesota
People from Worthington, Minnesota
People from Northfield, Minnesota
Editors of Minnesota newspapers
Writers from Minnesota
Suicides in Minnesota
St. Olaf College faculty